Pastirma or basturma, also called pastarma, pastourma, basdirma, or basterma, is a highly seasoned, air-dried cured beef that is found in the cuisines of Turkey, Armenia, the Levant, Azerbaijan, Bulgaria, Egypt, and Greece, Iraq and North Macedonia.

Etymology and history

Pastırma is mentioned in Mahmud of Kashgars Diwan Lughat al-Turk and Evliya Çelebis Seyahatname. According to Turkish scholar Biron Kiliç, the term pastirma is derived from the Turkic noun bastırma, which means "pressing".

Some say basturma originated in ancient Armenian cuisine, where it was known as aboukh'''. The Oxford Encyclopedia of Food and Drink writes that pastırma is the word the Ottomans used for a type of Byzantine cured beef that was called paston (παστόν). According to Johannes Koder, an expert in Byzantine studies,  paston could mean either salted meat or salted fish, while akropaston (ἀκρόπαστον) means salted meat. Andrew Dalby gives the definition of paston as "salted fish" and akropaston apakin as "well-salted fillet steak". Gregory Nagy gives the definition of akropaston as "smoked", describing apakin as "a kind of salami sausage, probably similar to pastourma". The Oxford Companion for Food says that a Byzantine dried meat delicacy was "a forerunner of the pastirma of modern Turkey".

Other scholars have given different accounts of the historical origins of the Ottoman pastırma. The armies of settled, agricultural peoples had cereal-based diets; some Turkish and Bulgarian scholars have written that certain medieval fighters who kept dried and salted meat under their saddles had an edge over opponents who ate mostly cereals. Ammianus Marcellinus wrote that the Huns warmed this meat by placing it between their legs or on the backs of their horses. 

The English word pastrami may be a Yiddish construction that combined salami with pastırma or one of the similar linguistic variations of the word (pastramă in Romanian, pastromá in Russian and basturma in Armenian).

Preparation and usage
 

Pastirma is usually made from water buffalo or beef, but other meats can also be used. In Egypt, pastirma is made not only with beef, but with lamb, water buffalo, goat and camel as well. Some pastirmas are made with horsemeat. Different cuts of meat may be used; a single cow can produce 26 different "types" of pastirma. Fillet, shank, leg and shoulder cuts are used for the best quality pastirmas. It is usually made during the months of October and November.

To make pastirma, the meat is rinsed and salted before being dried and pressed. After the first drying period, the meat is cold pressed for up to 16 hours. This aids the process of removing moisture from the meat. After the first pressing, the meat is dried for several days, during which the fats melt and form a white layer. The second press is a "hot press". Finally, the dried and pressed meat is covered with a spice paste called çemen. Çemen is made from a paste of ground fenugreek seeds, chili powder and mashed garlic. The dried product is covered with the wet paste and left to dry again. The entire process takes approximately one full month. Pastirma is classified as an "intermediate moisture food". Lowering the moisture level is a form of food preservation that hinders the growth of microorganisms, and the çemen paste "is used to control surface mold growth during storage". Other functions of the çemen include improved flavor, characteristic red coloring, prevention of further drying, and antimicrobial effects.

Cuisines
Ottoman cuisine was not only the product of Muslim citizens of the Ottoman Empire; it was also influenced by Ottoman Christian and Jewish citizens. Today, it includes the cuisines of Armenia, Egypt, Turkey and the Levant.
Armenia

The cured meat, which resembles Italian bresaola, is called basturma (բաստուրմա) or aboukht (ապուխտ) by Armenians. Some Armenian-owned pizzerias in cities like Yerevan, Boston and Los Angeles serve basturma topped pizza.

According to Nigol Bezjian, Armenians who survived the 1915 genocide brought basturma with them to the Middle East. Bezjian recalls that his grandmother used to prepare "basturma omelets fried in olive oil with pieces of lavash bread".  He notes that Armenians from Kayseri were particularly renowned basturma producers.

Arabs mocked Armenians with phrases like "It smells like there is basturma here", referring to the strong smell of basturma that is produced by the garlic and fenugreek mixture that the meat is coated in during preservation. Shoushou, a well-known Lebanese comedian of the 1960s–1970s, portrayed a caricature of an Armenian basturma seller; he retired the character after local Lebanese Armenians complained.

In Palestine, Armenian families gather on New Year's Eve and eat traditional foods including basturma, çiğ köfte and a traditional Anatolian confection called kaghtsr sujukh.

Bulgaria
Pastarma (as it is called in Bulgaria) arrived in Bulgaria in the 7th century. Specific products include Пастърма говежда / Pastarma Govezhda, which was registered as a Traditional Speciality Guaranteed in the EU in 2017.
Turkey

In Turkish cuisine pastırma can be eaten as a breakfast dish, and it is a common ingredient in omelettes, menemen (Turkish-style shakshouka) or a variation of eggs benedict. Pastırma may also be served as a meze appetizer.Pastırma can be used as a topping for hummus, pide bread, hamburgers, and toasted sandwichs with either cheddar cheese or Turkish kasar cheese. It can be as a filling for a börek that is made with kadayıf instead of the traditional filo dough. It may be combined with potato to make a filling for traditional böreks as well. 

It is also a common addition to many of the traditional vegetable dishes, especially the tomato and white bean stew called , but also cabbage, chickpeas, asparagus and spinach. It can also be used to make cheesy pull-apart bread.

Production
Turkey produces around 2041 tons of pastırma each year. The pastırma from Kayseri is particularly well known. In their 1893 report the British Foreign Office note that Kayseri, which they call Cesarea, "is specially renowned for the preparation of basturma (pemmican)". 
In Kastamonu, which produces around 200 tons of pastırma each year, çemen is made using garlic that is locally produced by the farming villages of Taşköprü.
See also

 
 
 
 
 
 

References

Bibliography
 Alan Davidson, The Oxford Companion to Food. Oxford University Press, Oxford 1999. .
 Maria Kaneva-Johnson, The Melting Pot. Balkan Food and Cookery'', Prospect Books, 1995.  .

External links
 

Lunch meat
Raw beef dishes
Dried meat

Armenian cuisine
Balkan cuisine
Byzantine cuisine
Middle Eastern cuisine
Ottoman cuisine
Turkish cuisine